Melitaea varia, the Grisons fritillary, is a butterfly of the family Nymphalidae. It is also found in the Ortler region in South Tyrol, Alpes-Maritimes and Drôme in France, high areas of Tirol in Austria and high areas in the  Apennine Mountains such as Abruzzo.

Description 
The wingspan is 24–28 mm.

Description from Seitz
varia Meyer-Dür (65b) is a smaller form from the higher Alps, recognizable by the markings on the hindwing beneath, which are pale yellow in the nymotypical form, being silvery white. In the male the markings in the median area of the forewing are usually somewhat obsolescent, the network formed by the veins and transverse lines being interrupted or paler before the apex. The female often shaded with blackish, the ground-colour having a tint of brass-colour or olive; the abdomen very heavy.

Biology 
There is one generation per year. The butterfly flies from June to August depending on the location. 
The larvae feed on various low-growing plants, including Plantago alpina, Gentiana verna and Gentiana acaulis.

References

External links

www.lepiforum.eu - Photos
pyrgus.de
"Melitaea Fabricius, 1807" at Markku Savela's Lepidoptera and Some Other Life Forms
Fauna Europaea

Melitaea
Butterflies of Europe
Butterflies described in 1851